The Yermakovsky mine is one of the largest beryllium mines in Russia. The mine is located in Buryatia. The mine has reserves amounting to 1.4 million tonnes of ore grading 1% beryllium.

See also 
 List of mines in Russia

References 

Beryllium mines in Russia
Buryatia

ru:Ермаковское месторождение